The St. Patrick Church is a Roman Catholic Church situated in the locality of Siddakatte, Bantwal. The church was built in 1926. This church comes under Roman Catholic Diocese of Mangalore.

History

The church was built in 1926.

Demographics

The parish has 282 families with a population of 1,504 members as of September 2014.

Administration
The church administration is famous for their service in education around Siddakatte. The institutions which are started by church administration are below.
 Bal Christ Nivas
 Shanthi Rani Convent  
 St. Patrick Higher Primary School
 St. Patrick English Medium School

See also 
Roman Catholicism in Mangalore
Goan Catholics
Church Of Sacred Heart Of Jesus, Madanthyar
 Christianity in Karnataka
 Most Holy Redeemer Church, Belthangady
 Church of Most Holy Saviour, Agrar
 Mangalore

References

Churches in Mangalore Diocese
Roman Catholic churches completed in 1926